Sir John Hardy, 1st Baronet (23 February 1809 – 9 July 1888), was a British Conservative Member of Parliament.

Background
Hardy, born 23 April 1809, was the eldest son of John Hardy and Isabele Gathorne. Gathorne Gathorne-Hardy, 1st Earl of Cranbrook, was his younger brother. He attended Oriel College, Oxford, gaining a BA in 1831, and a MA in 1834. On 13 June 1846 at Farnborough Church, Warwickshire, he married Laura Holbech or Holbeck, third daughter of William Holbech of Farnborough Hall, Warwickshire. At Low Moor, Bradford, the "roaring of cannon" and the "merry note of village bells" continued throughout the day. At 4.30pm the event was celebrated by 40 agents of the Low Moor Ironworks at Buttershaw House, with many toasts and speeches. The cannon "poured forth their voices of thunder" once more at nine pm.

The eldest of their three surviving sons was Sir Reginald Hardy (1848–1938), a JP and deputy lieutenant for Staffordshire, who succeeded to the baronetcy. A younger son was barrister Gerald Holbeck Hardy (Atherstone 1852 – Burton-upon-Trent 1929) of Arlington Street, Piccadilly. Gerald served as a major in the Queen's Own Royal Regiment, Staffordshire, in 1914.

Career
Hardy was the proprietor of the Low Moor Ironworks, Bradford. He was elected to the House of Commons for Midhurst in March 1859, but held the seat for less than two months. The following year he was returned for Dartmouth, a constituency he represented until 1868, and then sat for Warwickshire South from 1868 to 1874. His three unsuccessful attempts at representation were Plymouth (1857), Banbury (1859) and East Staffordshire (1880).

On 23 February 1876 he was created baronet of Dunstall Hall in the County of Stafford. In 1878 he was appointed High Sheriff of Staffordshire, after serving there as deputy lieutenant and magistrate, and on the Commission of the Peace for the West Riding of Yorkshire.

Death

John Hardy died aged 79 years on Monday 2 July 1888, after being hit by a brougham in windy weather and busy traffic while crossing South Audley Street, London, to post a letter. He sustained a compound fracture of the right femur, was placed on the floor of the brougham and taken the short distance to 22 South street, Park Lane. The wound did not begin to heal, and he died at home on the afternoon of 9 July 1888 of shock and exhaustion. The coroner's enquiry found that Hardy was of sound mind and that the driver of the brougham was not to blame. The funeral took place at 2 o'clock on Friday 13 July, at Dunstall Hall. He was buried in a plain oak coffin on the same day at St Mary's Church, Dunstall, in the graveyard outside the east end of the chancel, beside the grave of his wife Laura. The grave is "simply turfed at the head and sides." The funeral cortege walked from Dunstall Hall to the churchyard, and included local school children. Every blind in the village was closed in mourning, and local flags flew at half mast.

See also
 Gathorne Gathorne-Hardy, 1st Earl of Cranbrook
 Hardy baronets
 Dunstall Hall

References

Kidd, Charles, Williamson, David (editors). Debrett's Peerage and Baronetage (1990 edition). New York: St Martin's Press, 1990,

External links

1809 births
1888 deaths
Baronets in the Baronetage of the United Kingdom
Conservative Party (UK) MPs for English constituencies
UK MPs 1857–1859
UK MPs 1859–1865
UK MPs 1865–1868
UK MPs 1868–1874
High Sheriffs of Staffordshire
Members of the Parliament of the United Kingdom for Dartmouth
Gathorne-Hardy family